The 2021–22 FC Krasnodar season was the eleventh successive season that Krasnodar play in the Russian Premier League, the highest tier of association football in Russia. They finished the previous season in 10th place, missing out on European football for the first time since 2013–14 season. Aside from the Russian Premier League, Krasnodar also took part in the Russian Cup.

Season events
On 11 June, Krasnodar announced the signing of Vladimir Ilyin to a three-year contract from Akhmat Grozny.

On 4 July, German Onugkha made a permanent move to Vejle, where he'd been on loan to the previous season.

On 21 July, Kristoffer Olsson left Krasnodar to join Anderlecht.

On 23 July, Krasnodar announced the signing of Jhon Córdoba to a four-year contract from Hertha BSC.

On 2 August, Krasnodar announced the signing of Grzegorz Krychowiak to a three-year contract from Lokomotiv Moscow.

On 20 August, Ilya Zhigulyov left Krasnodar to sign for Ekstraklasa club Zagłębie Lubin.

On 8 September, Magomed-Shapi Suleymanov joined Giresunspor on loan for the remainder of the 2021–22 season.

On 22 December, Krasnodar announced the signing of Erik Botheim to a 3.5-year contract from Bodø/Glimt.

On 5 January, Krasnodar announced that Viktor Goncharenko had been sacked as Head Coach of the club.

On 7 January, Krasnodar announced that they had agreed a deal to sign Júnior Alonso from Atlético Mineiro on a contract until June 2025.

On 13 January, Krasnodar announced Daniel Farke as Viktor Goncharenko's replacement as Head Coach.

On 17 January, Tonny Vilhena joined Espanyol on loan until 30 June 2022.

On 24 February, Krasnodar's home match against Lokomotiv Moscow was postponed due to the local airport being shut by the Federal Air Transport Agency in relation to the 2021–2022 Russo-Ukrainian crisis.

On 2 March, Daniel Farke and his coaching staff left the club by mutual consent, with Aleksey Antonyuk being placed in temporary charge. The following day, Wanderson, Kaio, Erik Botheim, Cristian Ramírez, Júnior Alonso, Jhon Córdoba, Viktor Claesson and Rémy Cabella all suspended their contracts with Krasnodar and left the club's training base to train on their own. On 5 March, Viktor Claesson terminated his contract with Krasnodar by mutual consent. On 9 March, Rémy Cabella terminated his contract with Krasnodar by mutual consent. On 11 March, Wanderson joined Internacional on loan until 31 December 2022.

On 14 March, Júnior Alonso was loaned back to Atlético Mineiro until 31 December 2022. The following day, 15 March, Krasnodar announced that Grzegorz Krychowiak's contract had been suspended until 1 June 2022, with Krychowiak then signing for AEK Athens the same day until the end of the 2021–22 season.

On 16 March, Krasnodar's postponed round 19 match against Lokomotiv Moscow was rescheduled for 4 May.

On 18 May, Erik Botheim's agent announced that Botheim had terminated his contract with Krasnodar.

On 22 May, Krasnodar announced that Yevgeni Gorodov, Alyaksandr Martynovich and Yury Gazinsky had all left the club following the expiration of their contract.

Squad

Contract suspensions

Out on loan

Transfers

In

Loans in

Out

Loans out

Contract suspensions

Released

Friendlies

Competitions

Overview

Premier League

League table

Results summary

Results by round

Results

Russian Cup

Round of 32

Squad statistics

Appearances and goals

|-
|colspan="14"|Players who suspended their contracts:

|-
|colspan="14"|Players away from the club on loan:

|-
|colspan="14"|Players who left Krasnodar during the season:

|}

Goal scorers

Clean sheets

Disciplinary record

References

FC Krasnodar seasons
Krasnodar